Port Clyde is a community in the Canadian province of Nova Scotia, located in the Shelburne Municipal District of Shelburne County.

The community was a notable producer of wooden sailing ships in the Age of Sail, including the schooner Codseeker which survived a famous shipwreck just after she was built in 1877.

See also
 List of communities in Nova Scotia

References

External links
Port Clyde on Destination Nova Scotia

Communities in Shelburne County, Nova Scotia
General Service Areas in Nova Scotia